Basri Lohy (born 8 September 1986) is an Indonesian professional footballer who plays as a forward for Aceh United.

Career
He previously played for Persipon Pontianak, PSIM Yogyakarta, PSIS Semarang and Kalteng Putra FC.

Pelita Bandung Raya
On 29 December 2013, he signed with Pelita Bandung Raya for the 2014 Indonesia Super League season.

Pusamania Borneo
On January 20, 2015, he signed with Pusamania.

References

External links
 
 Player profil at goal.com

1986 births
Living people
Indonesian footballers
Liga 1 (Indonesia) players
PSIM Yogyakarta players
PSIS Semarang players
Pelita Bandung Raya players
Indonesian Premier Division players
Association football midfielders
Sportspeople from North Maluku
21st-century Indonesian people